The Church of the Lutheran Confession (CLC) is a conservative Christian religious body theologically adhering to confessional Lutheran doctrine.  Founded in 1960 in Minnesota, it has approximately 85 congregations  in 24 U.S. states, and missions in Canada, India, Africa, Nepal, and Myanmar.

The CLC maintains its headquarters at its ministerial college; Immanuel Lutheran High School, College & Seminary in Eau Claire, Wisconsin.

Historical background

Various Lutheran congregations left their synods during the 1950s and were independent at first. They began meeting together in 1957. The Church of the Lutheran Confession (CLC) was formed around the time of the break-up of the Evangelical Lutheran Synodical Conference of North America in 1963.

The CLC was created primarily (though not solely) from congregations that broke away from the Wisconsin Evangelical Lutheran Synod (WELS) and the Evangelical Lutheran Synod (ELS) because of a doctrinal difference in the matter of church fellowship. The CLC maintained that the WELS and ELS did not follow scriptural principles (Romans 16:17-18) when they did not break with the Synodical Conference and the Lutheran Church–Missouri Synod after they had publicly recognized doctrinal error within those bodies .

While there were joint talks in the 1990s between the CLC and the WELS and ELS to resolve the dispute, no resolution was reached. More recently, the CLC has been in formal discussions with the WELS and ELS over doctrinal issues. The goal of these discussions has been to establish doctrinal unity. In 2015, the "Joint Statement Regarding the Termination of Fellowship" was drafted by those involved in the discussions.  However, the 2017 CLC General Pastoral Conference recommended that the 2018 CLC Convention not adopt the "Joint Statement" as a resolution of the doctrinal difference in this matter, since it is unclear and contains some ambiguities.

Beliefs and practice

Core beliefs
The CLC teaches that the Bible is the only authoritative source for doctrine. It subscribes to the Lutheran Confessions (the Book of Concord, 1580) as an accurate presentation of what Scripture teaches. It is strongly linked to the concept of sola scriptura—scripture alone, and its website states, "If it is not Scripture; it is not Lutheran."

Ecumenical relations
Fellowship between the CLC and other church groups is established only upon investigation and confirmation that both church groups hold complete unity in scriptural doctrine and practice.

The CLC is currently in fellowship with several worldwide synods, some founded through mission work by the CLC.

Publishing and publications
The CLC Bookhouse is the official publishing house for the CLC. It is devoted to publishing Christian literature and CLC related religious materials, as well as several CLC periodicals.  The CLC Bookhouse also offers books and items from other publishing houses.

CLC periodicals include:
 The Lutheran Spokesman — the CLC's monthly family magazine
 Ministry by Mail — printed and online sermons for CLC members at a distance from their church
 The Journal of Theology — a quarterly theological magazine
 The Witness — an e-newsletter 

CLC educational materials include:
 God's Hand in our Lives — the CLC Sunday School Series
 Learn From Me — an adult instruction manual

Presidents

Paul Albrecht  1961–1972
Robert Reim  1972–1974
Egbert Albrecht  1974–1982
Daniel Fleischer  1982–2002
John Schierenbeck  2002–2012
Michael Eichstadt 2012–2023
Michael Wilke 2023–present

References

External links
The Church of the Lutheran Confession website

Lutheran denominations in North America
Lutheranism in Wisconsin
Lutheranism in the United States
Organizations based in Eau Claire, Wisconsin
Christian organizations established in 1960
1960 establishments in Minnesota